Ostufer Schweriner See is a former Amt in the Ludwigslust-Parchim district, in Mecklenburg-Vorpommern, Germany. It was named after Lake Schwerin. The seat of the Amt was in Leezen. It was disbanded on 1 January 2014, when its members joined the Amt Crivitz.

The Amt Ostufer Schweriner See consisted of the following municipalities:
Cambs
Dobin am See
Gneven
Langen Brütz
Leezen
Pinnow
Raben Steinfeld

Former Ämter in Mecklenburg-Western Pomerania